Observer Research Foundation (ORF) is an independent global think tank based in Delhi, India. The foundation has three centres in Mumbai, Chennai and Kolkata. ORF provides potentially viable inputs for policy and decision-makers in the Indian Government and to the political and business communities of India. ORF started out with an objective of dealing with internal issues of the economy in the wake of the 1990s reforms. However, today its mandate extends to security and strategy, governance, environment, energy and resources, economy and growth.

Origins
ORF was founded in part by the Dhirubhai Ambani family; it claims to operate independently, though. According to some reports, until 2009, 95% of the foundation's budget was provided by Reliance Industries, however, it is now estimated to be around 65% as the foundation diversified its source of finance to government, foreign foundations, and others.

Objectives
ORF has wide-ranging objectives pertaining to the aid and formulation of government policies; enabling representation of a broad section of opinions from all walks of life to strengthen India's democracy; providing a coherent, well-thought out policy formulations and recommendations to improve governance; improving economic development and consequently bettering the quality of life for Indian citizens and giving directions to India's foreign policy objectives.

Activities
As an organisation that aims to encourage voices from all corners of the world, ORF holds multiple international conferences including a flagship multilateral conference called Raisina Dialogue in collaboration with the Ministry of External Affairs. Speakers and participants at the annual conference have included renowned journalists, business leaders, civil society organizers as well as domestic and foreign delegates including Prime Ministers and other foreign ministers and officials.

Ranking
ORF was ranked 20th in the list of top think tanks worldwide in the 2020 edition of the Global Go Think Tank Index Report published by the Think Tanks and Civil Societies Program of the University of Pennsylvania. It was ranked 2nd among think tanks in China, India, Japan and South Korea.

Notable advisors and fellows

 H. H. S. Viswanathan, Indian Ambassador
 H. K. Dua, former Member of Parliament; former Media Advisor to the Prime Minister
 J. M. Mauskar IAS, former Chairman, Central Pollution Control Board and special secretary MOEF; member of HON PM climate change council
 Jayanta Bandyopadhyay, Former Professor of the Indian Institute of Management Calcutta
 K. K. Nayyar, former Vice-Chief, Indian Navy 
 M. Ashraf Haidari, Director General of Policy & Strategy of the Ministry of the Foreign Affairs of Afghanistan
 Manoj Joshi, journalist
 Mihir Sharma, Bloomberg opinion columnist and Senior Fellow
 Mitali Mukherjee, Financial journalist and Fellow
 Maya Mirchandani, journalist
 N. K. Singh, Indian Administrative Service officer
 Pinak Ranjan Chakravarty, Indian Ambassador
 Capt. P Raghu Raman, former U.N. Peacekeeper; former CEO Mahindra Special Services Group; former CEO, National Intelligence Grid (NATGRID); former President, Risk Security and New Ventures, Reliance Industries
 Rajeswari Pillai Rajagopalan, former Assistant Director, Indian National Security Council
 Rakesh Sood, Indian Ambassador 
 S. Paul Kapur, Professor, U.S. Naval Postgraduate School
(Dr.) Satish Misra, veteran journalist
 Sergey Kurginyan, Russian politician
 Vijay Latha Reddy, former Deputy National Security Advisor
 Vikram Sood, former head of the Indian intelligence agency Research and Analysis Wing

See also
 Raisina Dialogue
 Shangri-La Dialogue
 List of think tanks in India

References

External links
 

1990 establishments in Delhi
Foreign policy and strategy think tanks in India
Research institutes established in 1990
Research institutes in Delhi
Think tanks based in India